Walter Henslee Arnold (born August 31, 1958) is a former American football tight end in the National Football League for the Los Angeles Rams, the Houston Oilers, the Washington Redskins, and the Kansas City Chiefs.  He played college football at the University of New Mexico.

References

External links
NFL.com player page

1958 births
Living people
American football tight ends
Houston Oilers players
Kansas City Chiefs players
Los Angeles Rams players
New Mexico Lobos football players
Players of American football from Texas
Sportspeople from Galveston, Texas
Washington Redskins players